Toona fargesii, or the Chinese common name hong hua xiang chun is a medium-sized deciduous tree native to southern China that grows to a height of  tall.

References 

fargesii
Trees of China
Plants described in 1944
Taxa named by Auguste Chevalier